Coleophora subgilva is a moth of the family Coleophoridae that is endemic to Kazakhstan.

The larvae feed on Anabasis species.

References

External links

subgilva
Moths of Asia
Endemic fauna of Kazakhstan
Moths described in 1991